The 2nd Cabinet of North Korea was elected by the 1st Session of the 2nd Supreme People's Assembly on 20 September 1957. It was replaced on 23 October 1962 by the 3rd Cabinet.

Members

References

Citations

Bibliography
Books:
 

2nd Supreme People's Assembly
Cabinet of North Korea
1957 establishments in North Korea
1962 disestablishments in North Korea